The 1982 Individual Ice Speedway World Championship was the 17th edition of the World Championship  The Championship was held on ?, 1982 in Inzell in Germany.

The winner was Sergey Kazakov of the Soviet Union.

Classification

See also 
 1982 Individual Speedway World Championship in classic speedway
 1982 Team Ice Racing World Championship

References 

Ice speedway competitions
World